The Himachal Pradesh Police is the law enforcement agency for the state of Himachal Pradesh in India. It has one state headquarters at Shimla and 12 district headquarters in the state.

History
Himachal Pradesh as political entity came into existence on 15 April 1948. It was constituted by integrating the princely States of Chamba, Mandi, Suket, Sirmaur and 26 smaller states known as the Punjab Hill States. Subsequently, in 1954 Bilaspur, which was then a part "C" State, was also merged with Himachal Pradesh. In 1960 District Kinnaur was carved out of District Mahsu which was earlier constituted by merging 27 hill states. After the re-organization of Punjab in 1966, Shimla, Kangra, Kullu, Lahaul & Spiti Districts, Una Tehsil of Hoshiarpur District and Nalagarh Tehsil of Ambala District were also merged with the Union Territory of Himachal Pradesh. In 1972 Districts of Kangra and Mahasu were reorganized. District Kangra was trifurcated and Una and Hamirpur Tehsils were made into separate Districts. Some areas of Mahasu District were merged with Shimla District while the others formed the new District of Solan. In 1948, states like Mandi, Chamba, Sirmaur, Suket and Bilaspur had their regular Police forces. Other smaller states had a common Police Force. The Rulers of Punjab Hill States, with the exception of Sirmaur and Bilaspur, realized the advantage of establishing a common system of Policing in their States. The system was adopted as an experiment for three years from 1 April 1943. This was, in the true sense, the beginning of Himachal Pradesh Police. For proper administration of the scheme, an executive committee, consisting of five members was constituted. Four members of this committee were elected by the rulers from amongst themselves. The fifth member was nominated by the political agent of the Punjab Hill States to represent such states which may be under his direct administration due to minority of the rulers or for other reasons. The committee elected one of them as its chairman. In order to ensure proper administration of police work, an officer of the status of Supdt. of Police in British India was appointed. He had the authority to exercise general supervision over the police cadre in these states. In 1948, after the constitution of the Union Territory, efforts were made to stream line the police force in the state to bring it at par with other forces of the India Union. The police force drawn from different states having varying backgrounds and traditions were amalgamated to form the H.P. Police.

Organizational structure
Himachal Pradesh Police comes under direct control of Department of Home Affairs, Government of Himachal Pradesh.
The Himachal Pradesh Police is headed by Director General of Police (DGP). The Training college of Himachal Pradesh Police is situated at Daroh (Palampur).

List of Police Training Institutions of Himachal Pradesh

Crime Statics in Himachal Pradesh

Ranks of law enforcement in India
The ranks, posts and designations of all police officers vary from state to state as law and order is a state matter. But, generally the following pattern is observed:

Gazetted Officers

Non-gazetted officers

Transport of Himachal Pradesh  Police

Weapons and equipment of Himachal Pradesh Police

Services
Himachal police have another online services like Online Traffic Challan, FIR, Complaints Registering services on their Official website.

Notes

References

Government of Himachal Pradesh
State law enforcement agencies of India
Year of establishment missing
Government agencies with year of establishment missing